Northland Communications (formerly known as Northland Cable Television) was an American cable television, telephone and internet service provider with systems in various portions of the United States.  Northland Communications currently owns and operates smaller-market cable systems in Alabama, California, Georgia, Idaho, North Carolina, South Carolina, Texas and Washington. Northland is headquartered in Seattle, Washington and has a divisional office in Statesboro, Georgia. As of November 13, 2018, Northland has been acquired and is now owned and run by Vyve Broadband.

Corporate officers
John S. Whetzell
John S. Whetzell is the founder, and Chairman since December 1984, of Northland Communications Corporation — which is a General Partner of Northland Cable Properties Eight LP. He has been a Director of Northland Communications Corporation and Northland Telecommunications Corporation since March 1982. He was formerly Chief Executive Officer of Northland Telecommunications Corporation from March 1982 to May 2014, and as a Director of Northland Cable Television Inc.

His undergraduate degree is in economics from George Washington University, and he has an MBA degree from New York University. Whetzell has been involved with the cable television industry for over 29 years.

He first became involved in the cable television industry when he served as the Chief Economist of the Cable Television Bureau of the Federal Communications Commission (FCC) from May 1974 to February 1979.  He provided economic studies to support the deregulation of cable television both in federal and state arenas. He participated in the formulation of accounting standards for the industry and assisted the FCC in negotiating and developing the pole attachment rate formula for cable television.

Between March 1979 and February 1982, he was in charge of the Ernst & Whinney national cable television consulting services.

Gary Jones
Gary Jones serves as the current Chief Executive Officer and Chairman of Northland Cable Television Inc.

Areas served by Northland
Alabama
 Aliceville

California
 Mount Shasta
 Oakhurst
 Yreka

Georgia
 Statesboro
 Swainsboro
 Vidalia

Idaho
 Sandpoint

North Carolina
 Forest City
 Highlands

South Carolina
 Greenwood
 Seneca/Clemson
 Pickens

Texas
 Corsicana
 Crockett
 Lamesa
 Marble Falls
 Mexia
 Stephenville

Washington
 Moses Lake

Services available
 Northland Cable Television
 High-Speed Internet
 Northland Home Phone

References

External links
 Official Northland Communications website
 Northland Cable Properties Eight Limited Partnership

Cable television companies of the United States
Broadband
Companies based in Seattle
Mass media in Siskiyou County, California
Telecommunications companies established in 1981